

Hans-Walter Heyne-Hedersleben (10 January 1894 – 29 August 1967) was a general in the Wehrmacht of Nazi Germany. He was a recipient of the Knight's Cross of the Iron Cross. Heyne surrendered to the Soviet troops in June 1944 during the Bobruysk Offensive. Convicted as a war criminal in the Soviet Union, he was held until 1955.

Awards and decorations

 Knight's Cross of the Iron Cross on 4 April 1943 as Oberst and commander of Artillerie-Regiment 182

References

Citations

Bibliography

 

1894 births
1962 deaths
Military personnel from Hanover
Lieutenant generals of the German Army (Wehrmacht)
German Army personnel of World War I
Recipients of the clasp to the Iron Cross, 1st class
Recipients of the Knight's Cross of the Iron Cross
German prisoners of war in World War II held by the Soviet Union
People from the Province of Hanover